

A , more commonly referred to as a , is a Japanese hanging scroll used to display and exhibit paintings and calligraphy inscriptions and designs mounted usually with silk fabric edges on a flexible backing, so that it can be rolled for storage.

The "Maruhyōsō" style of kakejiku has four distinct named sections. The top section is called the "ten" heaven. The bottom is the "chi" earth with the "hashira" pillars supporting the heaven and earth on the sides. The maruhyōsō style, also contains a section of "ichimonji" made from "kinran" gold thread. On observation, the Ten is longer than the Chi. This is because in the past, Kakemono were viewed from a kneeling (seiza) position and provided perspective to the "Honshi" main work. This tradition carries on to modern times.

There is a cylindrical rod called jikugi (軸木) at the bottom, which becomes the axis or center of the rolled scroll. The end knobs on this rod are in themselves called jiku, and are used as grasps when rolling and unrolling the scroll.

Other parts of the scroll include the "jikubo" referenced above as the jikugi. The top half moon shaped wood rod is named the "hassō" to which the "kan" or metal loops are inserted in order to tie the "kakehimo" hanging thread. Attached to the jikubo are the "jikusaki", the term used for the end knobs, which can be inexpensive and made of plastic or relatively decorative pieces made of ceramic or lacquered wood. Additional decorative wood or ceramic pieces are called "fuchin" and come with multicolored tassels. The variation in the kakehimo, jikusaki and fuchin make each scroll more original and unique.

The arrival of kakemonos to the Spanish colonies in the Philippines and the Americas prompted local artists to imitate the format as a convenient way to provide portable art.

See also
Japanese painting
History of scrolls

Notes

References
 Mason, Penelope. History of Japanese Art. Prentice Hall (2004).

External links

Short documentary about how a kakejiku is being made

Japanese painting